Samuel Turner Fearon (1819 – 18 January 1854) was the first Chinese professor at the King's College, London. He was an interpreter in the First Opium War and a colonial servant and senior government official in British Hong Kong.

He was born in Chiswick, London in 1819. He was baptised in 1820 and first went to China in 1826 with his father, Christopher Fearon. He went to the Anglo-Chinese College in Malacca and was fluent in local tongue and became an interpreter in the First Opium War from 1839 to 1842. He was awarded China War Medal. After the war, he went to Hong Kong and became a civil servant in the British colony. He was a clerk and interpreter of the Magistrate Court and also a public notary and coroner. He later became the first Registral General and Collector of Chinese Revenue in 1846.

He became the first Chinese professor at the King's College, London when the Chinese program was institutionalised at the invitation of George Thomas Staunton in 1847, despite he was not a Sinologist. He did not give lectures and translate any classics or other works of Chinese language. At the end, the Chinese education at the King's College failed.

He died in St. Pancras, London on 18 January 1854. He was son of Christopher and Elizabeth Fearon. He married Caroline Libery in 1846 and had children Charles and Kate.

References

1819 births
1854 deaths
Hong Kong civil servants
Government officials of Hong Kong
People from Chiswick
Professorships at King's College London
Interpreters
19th-century translators